Alexander Ellis may refer to:

Alex Ellis (born 1991), Canadian racecar driver
Alexander John Ellis (1814–1890), English mathematician and philologist
Boo Ellis (Alexander Ellis, 1936–2010), American professional basketball player
Alexander Ellis (diplomat) (born 1967), British diplomat
Alex Ellis (American football) (born 1993), American football tight end
 Alexander Ellis III (born 1949), business executive
 Alex Ellis (rugby union) (born 1995) Canadian rugby union player